Frank De Bleeckere (born 1 July 1966) is a Belgian former football referee. He had been a referee since 1984, and an international (FIFA) official since 1998. De Bleeckere refereed in his first World Cup finals in Germany, and had to pass a late fitness test following injury.
He had been appointed by UEFA as one of twelve referees to officiate UEFA Euro 2008 matches, and was in charge of the semi final between Spain and Russia.

Career highlights

International appointments 
De Bleeckere made his international refereeing debut on 24 March 2001 in a FIFA World Cup 2002 Qualifier between Cyprus and the Republic of Ireland.

In 2005, he oversaw the FIFA U-17 World Championship Final between Mexico and Brazil. De Bleeckere refereed five games in the tournament, including the final.

One year later, in 2006, he was in charge of the 2006 FIFA World Cup qualifier between Turkey and Switzerland.

UEFA Champions League 
In 2005, De Bleeckere was in charge of the UEFA Champions League quarter-final match between Liverpool and Juventus.

During the UEFA Champions League 2006-07 group stage, De Bleeckere was chosen for the match between Chelsea and Barcelona.

Later in the tournament, De Bleeckere was appointed by UEFA to referee the semi-final between Milan and Manchester United on 2 May 2007.

In the 2007–08 tournament, he was assigned the first knockout round first leg game between Liverpool and Internazionale. He sent off Inter defender Marco Materazzi for two yellow card offences after 30 minutes, leaving Inter to play with 10 men for the rest of the match. Next, he was appointed for the quarter-final clash between Roma and Manchester United.

In 2008–09, De Bleeckere took charge of the Group E match between Manchester United and Celtic at Old Trafford on 21 October 2008.

In 2009–10, De Bleeckere took charge of the semi-final match between Barcelona and Inter on 28 April 2010. He was involved in a couple of controversial decisions. He gave Inter midfielder Thiago Motta a red card for an offense on Sergio Busquets.

In 2010–11, De Bleeckere was in charge of the second leg of the 2010–11 semi-final match between FC Barcelona and Real Madrid C.F.

2009 UEFA Super Cup 
On 28 August 2009, De Bleeckere took charge of the UEFA Super Cup match between the UEFA Champions League winners FC Barcelona and the last UEFA Cup winners FC Shakhtar Donetsk at the Stade Louis II in Monaco.

2006 FIFA World Cup

Group C: Argentina vs Ivory Coast 

De Bleeckere issued five yellows during this match, including Arsenal defender Emmanuel Eboué and Manchester United defender Gabriel Heinze.

Group F: Croatia vs Japan 
De Bleeckere showed five yellows again, including cards given to Japanese goalkeeper Yoshikatsu Kawaguchi and Croatian defender Darijo Srna. Also he awarded a penalty to Croatia.

Second round: England vs Ecuador 
Paul Robinson and Jamie Carragher were booked for time wasting, and John Terry for dangerous play. For Ecuador, three players made their way into the referee's book.

Quarterfinal: Italy vs Ukraine 
De Bleeckere refereed the match between Italy and Ukraine and had few troubles on the pitch, the match featured very few harsh tackles and De Bleeckere only had to hand out three yellow cards.

2010 FIFA World Cup 
He was preselected as a referee for the 2010 FIFA World Cup. He showed a second yellow and inevitably a red card to Loukas Vyntra on the 43rd minute during Switzerland - Greece game that was held on 5 September 2009.

He officiated the match between the United States and Algeria on 23 June.

International career 
2002 FIFA World Cup qualification
 Cyprus 0 Republic of Ireland 4, March 2001
 Moldova 0 Turkey 0, October 2001

UEFA Euro 2004 qualification
 Latvia 0 Sweden 0, September 2002
 Greece 1 Ukraine 0, June 2003
 Macedonia 1 England 2, September 2003

2003 FIFA World Youth Championship
 UAE 1 Slovakia 4, November 2003
 Japan 1 England 0, November 2003
 Colombia 0 Egypt 0, November 2003
 Panama 1 UAE 2, December 2003
 Argentina 3 Mali 1, December 2003
 Republic of Ireland 2 Colombia 2, December 2003
 Spain 1 Colombia 0, December 2003
 Colombia 2 Argentina 1, December 2003

UEFA Euro 2004
 Denmark 0 Italy 0, June 2004
 Russia 0 Portugal 2, June 2004
 Russia 2 Greece 1, June 2004

2006 FIFA World Cup qualification
 Slovenia 1 Italy 0, October 2004
 Armenia 1 Romania 1, November 2004
 Korea DPR 0 Japan 2, June 2005
 Estonia 0 Portugal 1, June 2005
 Sweden 3 Bulgaria 0, September 2005
 Denmark 1 Greece 0, October 2005
 Turkey 4 Switzerland 2, November 2005

2005 FIFA U-17 World Championship
 Peru 1 Ghana 1, September 2005
 Ivory Coast 0 North Korea 3, September 2005
 Qatar 0 Brazil 6, September 2005
 Turkey 3 Brazil 4, September 2005
 Mexico 3 Brazil 0, October 2005

FIFA World Cup 2006
 Argentina 2 Ivory Coast 1, June 2006
 Croatia 0 Japan 0, June 2006
 England 1 Ecuador 0, June 2006
 Italy 3 Ukraine 0, June 2006

UEFA Euro 2008 qualification
 Northern Ireland 3 Spain 2, September 2006

UEFA Euro 2008
 Croatia 2 Germany 1, June 2008
 Sweden 0 Russia 2, June 2008
 Russia 0 Spain 3, June 2008

Friendlies
 Portugal 1 Finland 4, March 2002
 Germany 1 Serbia and Montenegro 0, April 2003

2009 FIFA U-20 World Cup
 Egypt 4 Trinidad and Tobago 1, September 2009 Opening Match
 Nigeria 0 Spain 2, September 2009
 Australia 1 Brazil 3, October 2009
 Ghana - Brazil, October 2009 Final

Statistics

Notes

References

External links 
FIFA profile
Reuters profile
Rate Frank in the Euro 2008 Finals

1966 births
Living people
People from Oudenaarde
Belgian football referees
FIFA World Cup referees
2006 FIFA World Cup referees
2010 FIFA World Cup referees
UEFA Euro 2008 referees